Keerti is a given name which means "fame" or, in Kannada, "popular". People bearing the name include:

 Keerti Gaekwad Kelkar (born 1974), Indian actress and model
 Keerti Nagpure, Indian actress
 Keerti Shah (1928–2019), Indian virologist

See also
 Keerthi